Senecio sarracenicus, the broad-leaved ragwort, is a tall perennial herbaceous flowering plant belonging to the daisy family Asteraceae.

References

sarracenicus
Flora of Europe
Taxa named by Carl Linnaeus